The  Solid Rocket Motor Upgrade (SRMU) was a solid rocket motor that was used as a booster on the Titan IVB launch vehicle. Developed by Hercules (later ATK), it was intended to be a high-performance, low-cost upgrade to the UA1207 boosters previously used on Titan IV. Wound from carbon-fibre-reinforced polymer and burning a hydroxyl-terminated polybutadiene-bound ammonium perchlorate composite propellant, it was an ambitious upgrade building on Hercules' experience developing a filament-wound case for the Space Shuttle SRB. Originally intended to fly in 1990, it instead first flew in 1997 due to a protracted development and lack of demand. The SRMU performed successfully on all of its flights.

Design 
The SRMU is a three-segment solid rocket motor. Each segment has a casing wound from graphite fibre composite and an insulation system of EPDM rubber and kevlar. The casing is filled with a fuel grain composed primarily of ammonium perchlorate and aluminium, joined by a HTPB binder. Upon launch, the booster weighs approximately 776,000 lbs (352,000 kg).  The SRMU participates in vehicle control using a hydraulically driven thrust-vectoring nozzle, which can move up to 6 degrees. The hydraulic system features redundant pumps that keep the fluid loop at 3150 psi. These characteristics were chosen for greater performance and higher reliability compared to its predecessor, the UA1207, which was manufactured from 7 segments and used liquid fuel injection for steering. There are six stage separation motors, three fore and three aft, which push the empty casing away from the launcher's core after booster burnout.

The SRMU's electrical equipment and instrumentation is located within the nosecone at the front of the booster. Like the Space Shuttle's RSRM, operating voltage for the electrical system was 28V DC. An electrical detonator is used to activate pyrotechnics for booster ignition and staging, and for the flight termination system, which consists of a shaped charge explosive designed to destroy the booster in flight. The booster is attached to the vehicle core by a reinforced aft skirt near the base of the motor, which also transmits the thrust loads between the two structures. This skirt also contains the assembly for the thrust vectoring control (TVC) system. The nozzle itself is made of steel, wrapped in an epoxy composite similar to that on the motor segments. Additional structural elements include steel bands at segment joins. Each segment is manufactured separately, then integrated at the launch site.

As is typical for solid rocket motors, thrust varies throughout the course of the burn. The SRMU's fuel geometry is designed to generate highest thrust before 40 seconds, and to rapidly decrease thrust after 120 seconds. Two SRMUs provide all of the Titan IV-B's thrust at liftoff and function as a "stage 0"; the LR87-AJ-11 on the core ignites at T+131 seconds, 15 seconds before booster separation.

Development 
In the wake of the 1986 Space Shuttle Challenger Disaster, in which a seal joining two solid rocket motor segments failed, destroying the vehicle and killing all 7 crew, the US Air Force was concerned about the United Technologies-built UA120 boosters used on Titan carrier rockets. First flown in 1965, the UA120s were built from many segments and had a heavy thrust vectoring system that sprayed dinitrogen tetroxide into the nozzle flow to deflect thrust. Therefore, in 1987, the Air Force and the Titan's manufacturer, Martin Marietta, issued a request for proposals for a new booster to be used on Titan. A fixed-price contract was awarded to Hercules Inc. and the motor was expected to be ready in 1990.

Numerous delays took place during development. Martin Marietta changed the majority of its design requirements for the SRMU between 1988 and 1990, rendering progress slow. The SRMU was the largest motor Hercules had ever built, and it was also its first use of HTPB binder. Early in development, a test segment was lost due to improper fuel casting. In 1990, prior to the first stacking of the motor, the crane assembling the booster dropped a segment, causing it to roll away from the test area and explode. One worker was killed and nine injured. One year later, in the SRMU's first test firing, the motor exploded upon ignition. The motor had to be thoroughly redesigned. In the meantime, Martin Marietta placed an order for more UA120 motors, as the SRMU would not be ready in time. At the same time, Hercules' costs severely exceeded the value of the contract it had been awarded. The United States Congress in 1993 directed the Air Force to provide an additional $350 million to allow Hercules to finish work on the SRMU. Before the end of 1994, the booster had finally been qualified for flight.

By 1994, it had become apparent that Martin Marietta's additional order for UA1207 boosters, combined with a decline in demand for launches, was resulting in a surplus of completed Titan IV carrier rockets.  As a result, the SRMU would not be needed until 1997. A total of 17 flight sets of boosters were ordered; the last were used on the last Titan flight in 2005.

In 2000, the carbon-phenolic coated nozzle of the SRMU was redesigned. The new nozzle used new materials that were cleaner than those previously used, which were incompliant with new environmental regulations.

Gallery

See also 

 Comparison of orbital rocket engines
 Castor (rocket stage) - Castor 600 comparable
 Graphite-Epoxy Motor - contemporary Hercules development using similar technology

References 

Solid-fuel rockets
Orbital ATK
Rocket engines of the United States
Hercules Inc.